An imperial election was held  in Regensburg on 28 November 1562 to select the emperor of the Holy Roman Empire.

Background 
This was the third imperial election to take place during the Reformation.  On October 31, 1517, Martin Luther, a professor of moral theology at the University of Wittenberg, now part of the Martin Luther University of Halle-Wittenberg, had delivered the Ninety-five Theses to Albert of Brandenburg, the elector of Mainz.  This list of propositions criticized the practice of selling indulgences, remissions of the punishment meted out for sin in Purgatory.

Schmalkaldic War 

Luther's criticism snowballed into a massive schism in the church, and from there into a split among the states of the empire.  In 1527, John, Elector of Saxony, the elector of Saxony, established a Lutheran state church in Saxony with the elector as chief bishop.  On February 27, 1531, John joined Philip I, Landgrave of Hesse, the landgrave of Hesse, in establishing the Schmalkaldic League, a defensive military alliance of Lutheran principalities in which each pledged to support the other in the event of an attack by the forces of the Holy Roman Empire.  In time Anhalt, Württemberg, Pomerania, Augsburg, Frankfurt, Kempten, Brandenburg and the Electoral Palatinate were added to the League.

In view of the preparations of the emperor, Charles V, Holy Roman Emperor to suppress them, the members of the League launched a preemptive attack on his forces at the Catholic city of Füssen on July 10, 1546.  The ensuing war led to the defeat and dissolution of the Schmalkaldic League.  It led also to the 1547 Capitulation of Wittenberg, according to which John Frederick I, Elector of Saxony was compelled to cede the electorate to his cousin Maurice, Elector of Saxony, the first member of the Albertine branch of the House of Wettin to hold it.

Cuius regio, eius religio 

On May 15, 1548, Charles issued the Augsburg Interim.  Intended as a compromise between the Catholic empire and its Protestant princes and subjects, it permitted the marriage of Protestant clergy and the receipt by the laity of communion under both kinds.  However, it also ordered the readoption among Protestants of Catholic practices including the seven sacraments.  Domestic pressure from the Protestant subjects of the empire led to the offer of additional concessions in the Leipzig Interim in December, and finally to more violence.  On January 15, 1552 a coalition of Protestant princes of the Holy Roman Empire signed the Treaty of Chambord with the French king Henry II of France, inviting him to occupy the Three Bishoprics of Metz, Verdun and Toul in exchange for military assistance against Charles.  The renewed conflict was ended by the Peace of Passau of August 1552, which revoked the Augsburg Interim, and by the Peace of Augsburg of September 1555, which permitted princes of the empire to establish Lutheranism or Catholicism as their state religions.

Election of 1562 
Charles was succeeded by his brother Ferdinand I, Holy Roman Emperor upon his official abdication in 1558.  Ferdinand called for the election of his successor.  As king of Bohemia, he held one vote.  The remaining electors were:

 Daniel Brendel von Homburg, elector of Mainz
 Johann von der Leyen, elector of Trier
 Friedrich IV of Wied, elector of Cologne
 Frederick III, Elector Palatine, elector of the Electoral Palatinate
 Augustus, Elector of Saxony, elector of Saxony
 Joachim II Hector, Elector of Brandenburg, elector of Brandenburg

Elected 
Ferdinand's son Maximilian II, Holy Roman Emperor was elected.

Aftermath 
Maximilian acceded to the throne on his father's death  on July 25, 1564.

1562
1562 in the Holy Roman Empire
16th-century elections
Non-partisan elections
Maximilian II, Holy Roman Emperor
Ferdinand I, Holy Roman Emperor